The Soul to Soul Tour was a concert tour through North America, Europe and Australasia, undertaken by American blues rock band Stevie Ray Vaughan and Double Trouble from 1985 through 1986. At the beginning of the tour, the band had finished recording their album Soul to Soul. Their commercial and critical acclaim had been demonstrated during the Couldn't Stand the Weather Tour in 1984, when they had played before a sold-out audience at Carnegie Hall. Longing for opportunities to expand the group's lineup, Vaughan and Double Trouble hired keyboardist Reese Wynans during the Soul to Soul recording sessions in Dallas, Texas. Throughout the tour, the band's success was confirmed as their performances consistently amazed and gratified their audiences.

The first leg of the tour's itinerary took the band to the United States and then on to Europe, where they performed for nearly two weeks. They then returned to North America where during a span of eight months, they alternated visits between the US and Canada, before the fifth leg took the group to Australasia. After two additional North American legs, the band made a second trip to Europe, where the schedule of performances was interrupted after Vaughan suffered a mental breakdown, although he continued to perform two more shows with Double Trouble. The final leg in Europe incorporated stops in seven countries, before the group's return to the US in October 1986.

Although the tour elicited a variety of reactions from music critics, it was generally well-received. Among several sold-out shows, the Farm Aid concert sold over 40,000 tickets. The band's 1986 live album, Live Alive, was recorded during select shows of the tour, and many of its songs were played in 1986 through 1988. The length of the Soul to Soul Tour, then Vaughan and Double Trouble's longest, exhausted the band as the final leg unfolded. However, the extended break at the tour's conclusion enabled both Vaughan and bassist Tommy Shannon to enter treatment for drug and alcohol addictions and successfully achieve sobriety. In Vaughan's case, this lifestyle would continue through further tours in the following four years, prior to his death in a helicopter accident in August 1990.

Background
Stevie Ray Vaughan is widely regarded as one of the most influential electric guitarists in the history of blues music, and one of the most important musicians in the revival of blues in the 1980s. Allmusic describes him as "a rocking powerhouse of a guitarist who gave blues a burst of momentum in the '80s, with influence still felt long after his tragic death." Despite a mainstream career that spanned only seven years, Vaughan eventually became recognized among musicians as the future standard for success and promise in blues. Biographer Craig Hopkins explains that Vaughan's talent was the result of the youth culture in the 1960s: "the popularity of playing instruments as a form of teen entertainment, the prevalence of teen dances, the success of his older brother, the practicality of playing guitar as an outlet for a shy boy and the singular, intense focus on the guitar all contributed to create one of the best electric guitar players of all time."

Born and raised in Dallas, Texas, Vaughan began playing guitar at the age of seven, inspired by his older brother Jimmie Vaughan. He was an apt pupil, no less quick to learn than his brother, and was playing the guitar with striking virtuosity by the time he was fourteen. In 1971, he dropped out of high school and moved to Austin the following year. Soon afterward, he began playing gigs on the nightclub circuit, earning a spot in Marc Benno's band, the Nightcrawlers, and later with Denny Freeman in the Cobras, with whom he continued to work through late 1977. He then formed his own group, Double Trouble, before performing at the Montreux Jazz Festival in mid-July 1982 and being discovered by John Hammond, who in turn interested Epic Records with signing them to a recording contract. Within a year, they achieved international fame after the release of their debut album Texas Flood, and in 1984 their second album, Couldn't Stand the Weather, along with the supporting tour, brought them to further commercial and critical success; the album quickly outpaced the sales of Texas Flood.

In October 1984, Vaughan and Double Trouble headlined a sold-out performance at Carnegie Hall in New York City. For the second half of the concert, he added guitarist Jimmie Vaughan, keyboardist Dr. John, drummer George Rains, and the Roomful of Blues horn section. The ensemble rehearsed for less than two weeks before the performance, and according to biographers Joe Nick Patoski and Bill Crawford, the big band concept never entirely took form. However, Vaughan was determined to deviate from the group's power trio format: "We won't be limited to just the trio, although that doesn't mean we'll stop doing the trio. I'm planning on doing that too. I ain't gonna stay in one place. If I do, I'm stupid." As recording began for the band's third studio album, Soul to Soul, Vaughan found it increasingly difficult to be able to play rhythm guitar parts and sing at the same time, and was longing to add another dimension to the band. They hired keyboardist Reese Wynans to record on the album in April 1985; he joined the band soon thereafter.

Tour itinerary
For the opening leg, 21 concerts in the United States and Europe were scheduled from June through July 1985. The second leg of the tour consisted of 23 shows in North America from July to September. Two additional US legs were planned: the third leg from September–December 1985, and the fourth leg from January–March 1986. The fifth leg, which began in March, was the band's second full tour of Australasia and marked the first time they had visited certain venues. Scheduling for the sixth and seventh legs in North America from April–August allowed the band more off-days between shows than previous legs, but this amplified the exhaustion that had set in by the tour's end.

Typical Setlist

 "Scuttle Buttin'"
 "Say What!"
 "Ain't Gone 'n' Give Up on Love"
 Lookin' Out the Window
 "Look at Little Sister" (Hank Ballard cover)
 "Mary Had a Little Lamb" (Buddy Guy cover)
 "Voodoo Child (Slight Return)" (The Jimi Hendrix Experience cover)
 "Pride and Joy"
 "Cold Shot"
 "Come On (Part I)" (Earl King cover)
 "Couldn't Stand the Weather"
 "Love Struck Baby"
 "Life Without You" or "Testify" (The Isley Brothers cover) or "Third Stone From the Sun" (The Jimi Hendrix Experience cover) or "Rude Mood'

Tour dates

See also
 Stevie Ray Vaughan
 Soul to Soul

References
Footnotes

Bibliography

External links
 SRV Gig Database

Stevie Ray Vaughan concert tours
1985 concert tours
1986 concert tours